Madeleine Boschan (*1979 in Germany) is a German artist.

Biography 
Madeleine Boschan studied at the Hochschule für Bildende Künste Braunschweig from 2000–2006, where she was taught by John Armleder.

Since 2010 she has participated in numerous institutional exhibitions throughout Europe and North America focusing on: artistic strategies dealing with preconditioned role-models and relationships of people and architecture, as well as new tendencies of Abstract art, contemporary art from Berlin or Germany, and the interdisciplinary impact of the cabinet of curiosities on contemporary thinking, science and exhibition practice.

She lives and works in Berlin, Germany.

Practice 
Starting in 2008, Madeleine Boschan built her sculptures from found material. These first objets trouvés were modified, reassembled and brought into relation with each other by colour interventions. The different components lost their common value of utilization. With their machine-like appearance these sculptures seem to suggest expedience, still, they inhere in a kind of defunctionalised dissociation – as do indigenous fetishes or desolate and disused apparatus.

From her extensive occupation with Samuel Beckett's TV-pieces, such as "Quod I" and "Quod II", which he realized in 1981 for the German SDR, and his late "closed space stories" as "Worstward Ho" (1983) Madeleine Boschan has derived genuine poetics of space: Space 'itself' is empty and incomprehensible. It is for a body to appear within this void to designate it as a place, to grant contour, form, and shape to it, to constitute it as 'surrounding space'. According to Beckett, Boschan emphasises that spatial experience is first and foremost a physical experience: how does a body gain its halt and stand within the void, how does it find its appropriate place and holds up this position, how does it interact with other bodies?

In 2013 and 2014, she revised and reconsidered her primary pictorial vocabulary: standing, reclining, towering, tilting, arching as well as expansion, contraction, colour, form, measure, and positioning. For in a prudently arranged turn and, particularly, in contrast to the gestalt-like linearity of her prior works, she addresses herself to purely planar bodies; situated residing freely throughout the given space in utterly different phenomenal states; each for itself, yet, constantly in relation to each other.  Furthermore, Madeleine Boschan has inseparably incorporated "Technicolor's" base colours (red, blue, green, yellow, magenta, cyan, + black and white) into her forms. Colour is, thus, not just appended or appliquéd to her sculptures; rather, the specific chromaticity, being an immediate part of the sculptural operation, originates its very own specific forms.

In the years following, a most elementary question, Roland Barthes' final enquiry constituted the basis of her practice: "How to live together?" As she herself stated: "The earlier sculptures were linear, for sure, intrinsic and averted, withdrawn from us. And after some years, I simply longed to make them more planar, to give them more surface, realign them towards the surrounding space and relate them closer to us. If you like as a broadside at the beholder. And honestly, to me they are still all the same. Not visually, of course, but they all pose the same existential question of spatial corporality, of how a body gains its own stand, finds its appropriate place and holds up this position."

After 2016, "pieces dwelling on the concept of 'spaces within space' and, at the same time, of passage or transition" emerge, "fictive and functionless artefacts" which "retain the utopian ideas that are contained in the architectural strategies she references": Brasilian Tropicália, Jorge Ben, Astrud Gilberto, and Oscar Niemeyer, or James Cameron's cinematic use of the L.A. River-bed, Blade Runner'''s electric billboards, the topic of a ruinous antiquity, and the pastel colours of 1980's Miami.

In 2018 and 2019, Madeleine Boschan boldly turned the negative void space of the open passages and walk-through situations of her previous portals into positive shapes or entities. The beholders are confronted with a new corporeality. Accordingly, the surrounding walls and spaces associate themselves with these planar objects, conveying both their given objecthood as well as their potential pictorialness.

 Solo exhibitions 

2022
 Lying on stony ground the fragments, Kirche St. Getrud, Cologne
 it´s just a kiss away, Galerie Bernd Kugler, Innsbruck, Austria

2019
 In twilight these ridiculous and exquisite things descendingly move among the people, gently and imperishably, Sunday-S Gallery, Copenhagen, Denmark
 Tulips and chimneys, Galeria Maior, Palma de Mallorca, Spain
 the enormous room, Galerie Bernd Kugler, Innsbruck, Austria

2017
 BB 105/146, Galerie Lange und Pult, Zurich, Switzerland
 What lays bare in me, Collectors Agenda, Vienna, Austria
 Partance, Galerie Bernd Kugler, Innsbruck, Austria

2016
 in which its gaze, bent merely on itself, upholds and gleams, Hezi Cohen Gallery, Tel Aviv, Israel

2015
 Escapement (with Andy Hope 1930), Neue Galerie Gladbeck, Germany
 Galerie Bernd Kugler, Innsbruck
 or am I seduced by its ambient mauve, Herrenhaus Edenkoben, Germany
 what´s wrong with your eyes, Larry, Berlin, Germany

2014
 Technicolor: a) Feld, b) Fläche, Marburger Kunstverein, Marburg, Germany
 Capri, Vitamin, Reutlingen, Germany
 Deal with ´em, Jagla, Köln, Germany

2013
 Closed Space Stories, Hezi Cohen Gallery, Tel Aviv, Israel
 Don't you wonder sometimes 'bout sound and vision, Kunstverein Heppenheim, Heppenheim, Germany
 Say a body. Where none. Say a place. Where none. For the body. To be in., Kunstverein Ulm, Ulm, Germany
 Scope = immeasurable, Einraumhaus, Mannheim, Germany
 Anwesenheit unerreichbarer Bezugspunkte, Galerie Bernd Kugler, Innsbruck, Austria

2012
 An open Field, a Factory, a By-pass, Gloria, Berlin, Germany

2011
 Kayfabe, Galerie Bernd Kugler, Innsbruck, Austria
 RoidRage, Kwadrat, Berlin, Germany
 Niteflix, Autocenter, Berlin, Germany

2010
 Kalt, modern und teuer, Kwadrat, Berlin, Germany
 Cosmic Camping, Appartement, Berlin, Germany

 Group exhibitions 
202031:women. (Exhibition after Marcel Duchamp, 1943)., Daimler Art Collection, Berlin, BerlinJubeljahr, Städtisches Museum Schloss Salder, Salzgitter SalzgitterIntermezzo, Galerie Bernd Kugler, Innsbruck, Austria Innsbruck

2019some trees, Nino Mier Gallery, Los Angeles, Los AngelesComrades of time IV, Whatspace c/o Hardspace, Basel BaselAvanti, Michael Horbach Stiftung, Cologne Cologne

2018Junge Kunst / Junge Künstler, Skulpturenpark Heidelberg, HeidelbergLight in / as image, Daimler Art Collection 

2017Zehn Jahre Zürich, Galerie Lange + Pult, Zurich, SwitzerlandLob des Schattens (Italienischer Raum), Marc Strauss Gallery New York City, USModern sculpture, Galería Casado Santapau, Madrid, SpainArtists´Books for Everything, Weserburg | Museum für Moderne Kunst, BremenBerlin-Klondyke, Umetnostna Galereija Maribor, Maribor, SloweniaThree, two, one, Abbot Kinney, Venice, USThe Gift Collection, Galerie Bernd Kugler, Innsbruck, Austria

2016
Enea, Jona, SwitzerlandMoby Dick Filets, Secession, Vienna, AustriaWelt am Rand, Kunsthaus Erfurtbedsitter, Mirante, Vienna, AustriaStill Still Life, Galerie Bernd Kugler, Innsbruck, Austria

2015Wo ist hier?# 2: Raum und Gegenwart, Kunstverein Reutlingen, Germany
Enea, Jona, Switzerland18, Galerija Contra, Zagreb, SloveniaVanitas extended, Stedelijk Museum, Ypres, BelgiumStandard International – Post Spatial Devices No. II, Geisberg, Berlin, GermanyBerliner Edition, Salon Dahlmann, Berlin, GermanyLeipziger Edition, Kulturforum Altenkamp, Schloss Holte–Stukenbrock, GermanyCaritatis, Semperdepot, Vienna, Austria

2014Luggage and observations, Galerie Klaus Gerrit Friese, Stuttgart, Germany
 Psycho Killer, qu'est-ce que c'est?, Galerie Börgmann, Mönchengladbach, Germany
 Present, Kunstraum Kreuzberg / Bethanien, Berlin, Germany

2013Publications, Galerie Bernd Kugler, Innsbruck, AustriaBerlin Klondyke, Hipp Halle, Gmunden, AustriaNovecento mai visto. Highlights from the Daimler Art Collection. From Albers to Warhol to now, Museo di Santa Giulia, Brescia, ItalyThe Legend of the Shelves, Autocenter, Berlin, Germany

2012
 Accelerating toward Apocalypse (Private / Corporate VII), Daimler Contemporary, Berlin, Germany
 Gare de l'Est, Esslinger Kunstverein, Villa Merkel, Esslingen, Germany
 En désordre, Philara – Sammlung zeitgenössischer Kunst, Düsseldorf, Germany
 Berlin Klondyke, Neuer Pfaffenhofener Kunstverein, Pfaffenhofen, Germany
 Gentle Giants II, Kwadrat, Berlin, Germany
 Abstract confusion, Kunsthalle Erfurt, Erfurt, Germany
 Status. Berlin (1), Künstlerhaus Bethanien, Berlin, Germany
 Black Oriental, Galerie Bernd Kugler, Innsbruck, Austria
 Eine Frau, ein Baum, eine Kuh, Museum für Konkrete Kunst Ingolstadt, Ingolstadt, Germany

2011
 Based in Berlin, Hamburger Bahnhof, Berlin, Germany
 Berlin Klondyke, Art Center, Los Angeles, U.S.
 Synecdoche, Bourouina Gallery, Berlin, Germany
 Abstract confusion'', Kunstverein Ulm, Ulm, Germany

Private and public collections 
Daimler Art Collection, Stuttgart, Germany
Philara – Sammlung zeitgenössischer Kunst, Düsseldorf, Germany

References

External links 

Galerie Bernd Kugler, Innsbruck, Austria
Hezi Cohen Gallery, Tel Aviv, Israel

1979 births
German installation artists
21st-century German sculptors
21st-century German women artists
Living people